Lise Gauvin (born October 9, 1940) is a Canadian writer and literary critic from Quebec.

Biography
She was born in Quebec City and pursued literary studies at Université Laval and the University of Vienna. She went on to earn a doctorate from the Paris-Sorbonne University in 1967. In 1969, she began teaching in the French studies department at the Université de Montréal; in 1998, she became department director. She was director for the review  from 1994 to 2000. She also contributed to various publications including Le Devoir.

In 1984, she was elected president of the Association des éditeurs de périodiques culturels québécois. In 2000, she became a member of the Académie des lettres du Québec and the Royal Society of Canada. In 2005, she was named a Chevalier in the French Ordre des Palmes Académiques. In 2015, she was named an Officer in the National Order of Quebec.

Selected works 
 Fugitives short stories (1991), received the  Prix des Arcades of Bologna
 L'écrivain francophone à la croisée des langues (1997), received the 
 Langagement - l'écrivain et la langue au Québec (2000)
 Fabrique de la langue (2004)

References 

1940 births
Living people
Canadian women non-fiction writers
Canadian literary critics
Women literary critics
Officers of the National Order of Quebec
Fellows of the Royal Society of Canada
Chevaliers of the Ordre des Palmes Académiques
Writers from Quebec City
Université Laval alumni
University of Vienna alumni
Academic staff of the Université de Montréal